The 1902 Yale Bulldogs football team was an American football team that represented Yale University as an independent during the 1902 college football season. The team finished with an 11–0–1 record, shut out eight of twelve opponents, and outscored all opponents by a total of 286 to 22. Joseph R. Swan was the head coach, and George B. Chadwick was the team captain.

Yale was selected as the 1902 champion in the 1903 edition of the World Almanac.

In 1933 Yale was retroactively named as the national co-champion, along with Michigan, by NCAA-designated "major selector" Parke H. Davis.

Seven Yale players were selected as consensus first-team players on the 1902 All-America team. The team's consensus All-Americans were: quarterback Foster Rockwell; halfback George B. Chadwick; end Tom Shevlin; center Henry Holt; guard Edward Glass; and tackles Ralph Kinney and James Hogan.

Schedule

References

Yale
Yale Bulldogs football seasons
College football national champions
College football undefeated seasons
Yale Bulldogs football